The Immediate Geographic Region of São João Nepomuceno-Bicas is one of the 10 immediate geographic regions in the Intermediate Geographic Region of Juiz de Fora, one of the 70 immediate geographic regions in the Brazilian state of Minas Gerais and one of the 509 of Brazil, created by the National Institute of Geography and Statistics (IBGE) in 2017.

Municipalities 
It comprises 9 municipalities.

 Bicas     
 Descoberto   
 Guarará    
 Mar de Espanha   
 Maripá de Minas  
 Pequeri    
 Rochedo de Minas   
 São João Nepomuceno   
 Senador Cortes

References 

Geography of Minas Gerais